Olea is a genus of about 40 species in the family Oleaceae, native to warm temperate and tropical regions of the Middle East, southern Europe, Africa, southern Asia, and Australasia. They are evergreen trees and shrubs, with small, opposite, entire leaves. The fruit is a drupe. Leaves of Olea contain trichosclereids.

For humans, the most important and familiar species is by far the olive (Olea europaea), native to the Mediterranean region, Africa, southwest Asia, and the Himalayas, which is the type species of the genus. The native olive (O. paniculata) is a larger tree, attaining a height of 15–18 m in the forests of Queensland, and yielding a hard and tough timber. The yet harder wood of the black ironwood O. capensis, an inhabitant of Natal, is important in South Africa.

Olea species are used as food plants by the larvae of some Lepidoptera species including double-striped pug.

Species
Species accepted:

 Olea ambrensis H.Perrier - Madagascar
 Olea borneensis Boerl. - Borneo, Philippines
 Olea brachiata (Lour.) Merr. - Guangdong, Hainan, Cambodia, Thailand, Vietnam, Peninsular Malaysia, Anambas Islands
 Olea capensis L. – Small Ironwood - Comoros, Madagascar; Africa from South Africa north to Ethiopia, Sudan, Zaire, Nigeria, Ivory Coast, etc
 Olea capitellata  Ridl. - Pahang
 Olea caudatilimba L.C.Chia - Yunnan
 Olea chimanimani Kupicha - Chimanimani Mountains of Mozambique and Zimbabwe
 Olea cordatula H.L.Li - Vietnam
 Olea dioica Roxb. - India, Bangladesh, Myanmar
 Olea europaea L. – Olive - Mediterranean, Africa, southwestern Asia, Himalayas; naturalized many other places
 Olea exasperata Jacq. - South Africa
 Olea gagnepainii Knobl. - Thailand, Laos
 Olea gamblei C.B.Clarke - Sikkim
 Olea hainanensis H.L.Li - Vietnam, Laos, Guangdong, Hainan
 Olea javanica (Blume) Knobl. - Philippines, western Indonesia
 Olea lancea Lam. - Madagascar, Mauritius, Réunion, Rodrigues Island
 Olea laxiflora H.L.Li - Yunnan
 Olea moluccensis Kiew - Maluku
 Olea neriifolia H.L.Li - Hainan
 Olea palawanensis Kiew - Palawan
 Olea paniculata R.Br. - Yunnan, India, Indochina, Indonesia, Kashmir, Malaysia, Nepal, New Guinea, Pakistan, Sri Lanka, Australia, New Caledonia, Vanuatu
 Olea parvilimba (Merr. & Chun) B.M.Miao - Hainan, Vietnam
 Olea polygama Wight - India, Sri Lanka
 Olea puberula  Ridl. - Peninsular Malaysia
 Olea rosea Craib - Yunnan, Thailand
 Olea rubrovenia (Elmer) Kiew - Borneo, Philippines
 Olea salicifolia Wall. ex G.Don - Assam, southern China, Indochina
 Olea schliebenii Knobl. - Tanzania 
 Olea tetragonoclada L.C.Chia - Guangxi
 Olea tsoongii (Merr.) P.S.Green - Guangdong, Guangxi, Guizhou, Hainan, Sichuan, Yunnan
 Olea welwitschii (Knobl.) Gilg & G.Schellenb. - central and eastern Africa from Ethiopia to Zimbabwe
 Olea wightiana Wall. ex G.Don - India
 Olea woodiana Knobl. - South Africa, Eswatini, Kenya, Tanzania
 Olea yuennanensis Hand.-Mazz. - China

Formerly placed here
Chionanthus foveolatus (E.Mey.) Stearn (as O. foveolata E.Mey.)
Ligustrum compactum var. compactum (as O. compacta Wall. ex G.Don)
Nestegis cunninghamii (Hook.f.) L.A.S.Johnson (as O. cunninghamii Hook.f.)
Noronhia emarginata (Lam.) Thouars (as O. emarginata Lam.)
Osmanthus americanus (L.) Benth. & Hook.f. ex A.Gray (as O. americana L.)
Osmanthus heterophyllus (G. Don) P.S.Green (as O. aquifolium Siebold & Zucc. or O. ilicifolia Siebold ex Hassk.)
 List source :

References

 
Oleaceae genera
Lamiales of Asia